Love You to Pieces is the debut studio album by American heavy metal band Lizzy Borden, released on Metal Blade Records. The album would produce the song "American Metal" which would later be added to the Metal Blade Records 20th Anniversary box set.

In 2001, the album was re-released by Metal Blade Records with bonus tracks and again on vinyl in 2018 before the release of the band's album My Midnight Things.

Track listing

Personnel
Lizzy Borden
Lizzy Borden – lead and backing vocals
Gene Allen – guitars, backing vocals
Tony Matuzak – guitars
Michael Davis – bass, backing vocals
Joey Scott Harges – drums, backing vocals

Additional musicians
Jon Natisch, Mark Benson, Tony Copozzi – backing vocals

Production
Randy Burns – engineer
Eddie Schreyer – mastering at Capitol Records, Los Angeles
Brian Slagel – executive producer
Tom Baker – 2001 remastering

References

1985 debut albums
Lizzy Borden (band) albums
Metal Blade Records albums